The University of New Brunswick (UNB) is a public university with two primary campuses in Fredericton and Saint John, New Brunswick. It is the oldest English-language university in Canada, and among the oldest public universities in North America. UNB was founded by a group of seven Loyalists who left the United States after the American Revolution.

UNB has two main campuses: the original campus, founded in 1785 in Fredericton, and a smaller campus which opened in Saint John in 1964. The Saint John campus is home to New Brunswick's anglophone medical school, Dalhousie Medicine New Brunswick, an affiliate of Dalhousie University. In addition, there are two small satellite health sciences campuses located in Moncton and Bathurst, New Brunswick, and two offices in the Caribbean and in Beijing. UNB offers over 75 degrees in fourteen faculties at the undergraduate and graduate levels with a total student enrolment of approximately 9,700 between the two principal campuses. UNB was named the most entrepreneurial university in Canada at the 2014 Startup Canada Awards.

The University of New Brunswick has educated numerous Canadian federal cabinet ministers including Sir John Douglas Hazen, William Pugsley and Gerald Merrithew, many Premiers of New Brunswick such as Frank McKenna and Blaine Higgs, two puisne justices of the Supreme Court of Canada, Oswald Smith Crocket and  Gérard La Forest, as well as prominent artists and writers. UNB had ties to the Confederation Poets movement; Bliss Carman and Sir Charles G.D. Roberts were alumni.

History

Founding and charters
In 1783, Loyalist settlers began to build upon the ruins of a former Acadian village called Ste-Anne-des-Pays-Bas. The new settlement was named Frederick's Town in honour of Prince Frederick, son of King George III and uncle of Queen Victoria.

Initially modelled on the Anglican ideals of older, European institutions, the University of New Brunswick was founded in 1785 as the Academy of Liberal Arts and Sciences. The petition requesting the establishment of the school, titled "The Founders' Petition of 1785," was addressed to Governor Thomas Carleton and was signed by seven Loyalist men: William Paine, William Wanton, George Sproule, Zephaniah Kingsley, Sr., John Coffin, Ward Chipman, and Adino Paddock.

By an 1800 provincial charter, signed by Provincial Secretary Jonathan Odell, the Academy of Liberal Arts and Sciences became the College of New Brunswick. The college was succeeded by King's College, which was granted by royal charter in December 1827. King's College operated under the control of the Church of England until 1859, when it was made non-sectarian by an act of the provincial legislature that transformed the college into the University of New Brunswick. In 1866, Mary Kingsley Tibbits became the first regularly admitted female student of UNB. By 1867, the University of New Brunswick had two faculties: Arts and Applied Science. It awarded the degrees of Bachelor of Arts, Bachelor of Science, Master of Arts, and Doctor of Science. The latter was awarded only in the fields of civil engineering, electrical engineering, and forestry.

UNB was one of only two schools in Canada in the late 1800s that offered a Forestry Engineering degree (the other being the University of Toronto). So when the federal government began creating Dominion Forests on federal land in Western Canada between 1899 and 1906, most of the first Forest Rangers were from UNB.

20th/21st centuries

In 1906, UNB established a bicameral system of university government consisting of a senate responsible for academic policy, and a board of governors exercising exclusive control over financial policy and other matters. The president, appointed by the board, was to provide a link between the two bodies and to provide institutional leadership. At this time, the university had 156 male students, 21 female students, and only eleven academic staff, who were all male.

In 1964, a second, smaller campus was established in Saint John, New Brunswick. The growth of the UNBSJ campus is particularly notable, for the campus began with only 96 students spread throughout various buildings in Saint John's central business district. In 1968, UNBSJ moved to its new home at Tucker Park.

In 1968 the university's governance structure was reorganized with the aim of giving faculty members control of academic affairs. The UNB Act of 1968 led to the formation of two governing bodies, both chaired by the president. The Board of Governors, whose role was to oversee and give guidance to president as "chief executive officer" was to have four faculty representatives, while the majority of the Senate was to be made up of faculty members elected by their peers.

The Association of University of New Brunswick Teachers (AUNBT) was established in 1954; in 1979, this association became the bargaining agent for all full-time academic staff, and in 2008, it achieved certification for contract academic staff.

Relocation of the Faculty of Law

In 1959, the Faculty of Law moved from Saint John to Fredericton following a report on the status of legal education in Canada by Professor Maxwell Cohen from McGill University, claiming that the Saint John Law School was only "nominally a faculty of UNB". This prompted Chancellor Lord Beaverbrook and UNB President Colin B. Mackay to permanently move the Law School despite the Dean's objections.

Campuses

Currently UNBF has approximately 9,000 students, while UNBSJ has 3,000. Though UNBF has more students at the moment, UNBSJ is growing at a faster rate. Both campuses have undergone significant expansion over the years, and many university buildings have received funding from Lord Beaverbrook and other prominent industrialists and philanthropists. UNB's largest expansion coincided with the baby boom, when its Fredericton campus tripled in size.

Fredericton
The UNB Fredericton campus is located on a hill overlooking the Saint John River. The campus is well known for its colourful fall foliage, Georgian style red-brick buildings, and a very steep hill. UNB Fredericton has shared the "College Hill" with St. Thomas University (STU) since 1964, when the former St. Thomas College moved from Chatham, NB (now Miramichi). While the universities share some infrastructure, they remain separate institutions.

National Historic Sites
Two buildings in Fredericton have been designated National Historic Sites of Canada: the 1827 Sir Howard Douglas Hall (Old Arts), and the 1851 William Brydone Jack Observatory.

Architecture
Architect G. Ernest Fairweather designed several of the campus buildings, including the Old Civil Engineering Building (1900) and the Gymnasium (1906). In addition, several of the stained glass windows in the Convocation Hall were created by Robert McCausland Limited. UNBF's War Memorial Hall (usually referred to as Memorial Hall), originally built as a science building in 1924, honours the 35 UNB Alumni who died in World War I. UNBF's Brigadier Milton F. Gregg, V.C., Centre for the Study of War and Society (usually referred to as The Gregg Centre) was created in 2006. The Richard J. Currie Center, a five-storey 139,000-square-foot building, was constructed in 2013.

Saint John

The UNB Saint John campus (UNBSJ) is located in Tucker Park in the Millidgeville neighbourhood, several kilometres north of the city's central business district, and has views of the Kennebecasis River and Grand Bay. New Brunswick's largest health care facility, Saint John Regional Hospital, is located adjacent to the UNBSJ campus. Since 2010, the UNBSJ campus has been home to Dalhousie Medicine New Brunswick, a medical school that operates as a partnership between the Government of New Brunswick, the University of New Brunswick and Dalhousie’s Faculty of Medicine.

The Saint John campus has undergone expansion over the years and is the fastest growing component of the UNB system with many new buildings constructed between the 1970s and the first decade of the 21st century. A trend in recent years has been a growth in the number of international students.

Notable differences from its parent campus in Fredericton lay in the campus culture. While UNB Fredericton has a substantial number of students living in its on-campus residences, this is not the case for UNBSJ. The majority of students do not live within walking distance of the campus due to its remote location, so unlike Fredericton, Saint John is predominantly a "commuter campus".

Architecture

Construction on the Hans W. Klohn Commons began on April 1, 2010, and the building officially opened on September 7, 2011. This building is one of the most environmentally friendly buildings in Atlantic Canada. The building features an electric elevator that produces power for the commons. The building is part of the Tucker Park enhancement project, which includes the refurbishment of the Canada Games Stadium, the new Dalhousie Medicine New Brunswick facility, and the New Brunswick Community College's Allied Health building. The Commons houses the library, Writing Centre, Math and Science Help Centre, an IT help desk, and the Commons Cafe.

A new residence building, named the Barry and Flora Beckett Residence, which opened in Winter 2021, is a geothermally-heated building, offering 104 beds. This new residence building is named after the Becketts; two prominent figures in the campus' history. Dr Barry Beckett taught as a chemistry professor all the way back when UNB Saint John was just a campus in uptown Saint John, while Dr Flora Beckett taught mathematics and served as the director of the Math Help Centre. With the announcement of the Integrated Health Initiative (IHI), the campus is set to reconstruct the currently (unused) Ward Chipman Library into the new Health and Social Innovation Centre.

Programs 
There are over 75 undergraduate programs, while the School of Graduate Studies offers course and research-based programs in over 30 fields. UNB has a 16:1 student-to-faculty ratio.

 Arts – Anthropology (Fredericton), Classics and Ancient History (Fredericton), Creative Writing (Fredericton), Culture and Media Studies (Fredericton), Drama (Fredericton), Economics (Fredericton), English (Fredericton), French (Fredericton), History (Fredericton), History & Politics (Saint John), Humanities & Languages (Saint John), International Development Studies (Fredericton), Philosophy (Fredericton), Political Science (Fredericton), Psychology (Fredericton), Psychology (Saint John), Social Science (Saint John), Sociology (Fredericton)
 Business – Faculty of Business (Saint John), Faculty of Management (Fredericton)
 Computer Science – Computer Science (Fredericton), Computer Science (Saint John)
 Education – Faculty of Education (Fredericton)
 Engineering – Chemical Engineering (Fredericton), Civil Engineering (Fredericton), Electrical Engineering (Fredericton), Software Engineering (Fredericton), Geodesy and Geomatics Engineering (Fredericton), Geological Engineering (Fredericton), Mechanical Engineering (Fredericton), two-year Engineering Certificate (Saint John)
 Forestry – Forestry & Environmental Management (Fredericton)
Health – Society and Health (Saint John), Management in Health (Saint John), Biomedical Sciences and Health (Saint John)
 Kinesiology – Faculty of Kinesiology (Fredericton)
 Law – Faculty of Law (Fredericton)
 Leadership Studies – Renaissance College (Fredericton)
 Nursing – Faculty of Nursing (Fredericton), Faculty of Nursing (Moncton), Humber College (Toronto), Nursing & Health Sciences (Saint John)
 Science – Biological Sciences (Saint John), Biology (Fredericton), Chemistry (Fredericton), Earth Sciences (Fredericton), Environmental Sciences (Fredericton), Mathematics and Statistics (Fredericton), Mathematics and Statistics (Saint John), Physics (Fredericton), Physics (bi-campus)

Research and academics
UNB is the seat of 14 Canada Research Chairs and is home to more than 60 research centres and institutes. It conducts about 75 per cent of all university research in the province. UNB's annual research spending (2013–14) generated $32.2 million in added provincial income  for the New Brunswick economy. Between 2004 and 2009, the university's research revenue increased by 77 per cent: the highest increase among Canadian comprehensive universities.

UNB has developed technology used by Google, is a research partner with the NASA Jet Propulsion Laboratory, is a global leader in powered prosthetic research and developing MRI technology, and is home to one of the motion analysis labs in North America as well as the world's first research centre in dermoskeletics.

Reputation

In 2021, UNB was awarded 5 stars from the QS World University Rankings, the second university in Atlantic Canada to receive this rating.

In Maclean's 2023 "comprehensive university" rankings, UNB ranked eighth out of 15 universities, tied with Toronto Metropolitan University.

In 2014, UNB was awarded the most entrepreneurial university in Canada by Startup Canada. The university has also supported in launching 23 new startup companies as of 2015.

In 2012, UNB's law school was ranked second nationally in elite firm hiring by Maclean's. According to Canadian Lawyer Magazine, the law school ranks among the top five in Canada.

In 2008, the National Post and the Ottawa Citizen recognized UNB as being among the top three comprehensive research universities in Canada for the highest percentage growth of research income across a five-year period.

Faculty of Engineering

The University of New Brunswick is noted particularly for engineering, and its Faculty of Engineering, which opened in the late 1800s, was the first to offer engineering degrees in Canada. Engineering is one of the three major UNB faculties, with five departments offering seven accredited engineering programmes in Civil Engineering, Chemical Engineering, Electrical Engineering, Geodesy & Geomatics Engineering, Geological Engineering (jointly offered with the Faculty of Science), Mechanical Engineering, and Software Engineering (jointly offered with the Faculty of Computer Science). The faculty had 920 full-time equivalent students as of Winter 2021. The Times Higher Education’s 2023 World University Rankings list by subject has placed UNB Engineering in the top 250 engineering programmes in the world.

UNB Engineering is renowned for its multi-faceted programmes like Geodesy and Geomatics – one of the world's top-ranked departments and UNB's foremost research hub reputed as a leader in satellite positioning technology, high-accuracy gravity field determination, and 3D high-resolution digital mapping systems. The Department's researchers helped NASA map the Moon, designed technologies used by Google and USGS, developed satellite technology for precision mapping of polar regions and the Arctic Ocean, improved fundamental mathematics and physics methodology like spectral analysis, and helped nations solve strategic problems and safety issues across the globe.

Poets' Corner
Because so many of UNB's students, alumni, and professors have produced celebrated poetry, the city of Fredericton has earned the nickname "Poets' Corner." Two of Canada's four Confederation Poets – Sir Charles G.D. Roberts and Bliss Carman – were educated at UNB, as was Francis Joseph Sherman, along with a number of notable 20th- and 21st-century Canadian writers. In 1947, the Historic Sites and Monuments Board of Canada unveiled a "Poet's Corner" monument in honour of Carman, Roberts, and Sherman.

Institute of Biomedical Engineering
The Institute of Biomedical Engineering (IBME) on the Fredericton campus is one of the research institutes in biomedical engineering in Canada. It was founded in 1965 as the Bio-Engineering Institute, making it one of the oldest research institutes to be solely dedicated to the field of biomedical engineering. The institute is also the region's prosthetic fitting centre where amputees are fitted with "intelligent" artificial limbs. The institute also carries out research in the field of myoelectric signal processing, biomedical instrumentation and human motion analysis. The IBME also developed the UNB Test of Prosthetic Function which is used by researchers all over the world. Although the institute does not offer degrees in biomedical engineering, students at UNB usually enrol in one of the other faculties of engineering such as electrical or mechanical and pursue their research in biomedical engineering at the IBME.

Canadian Rivers Institute

The Canadian Rivers Institute was founded in 2000 and is a site of river sciences research. The mandate of the CRI is to conduct both multi-disciplinary basic and applied research focusing on rivers from their headwaters to their estuaries, to promote the conservation, protection and sustainable use of water, and to educate professionals, graduate students and the public on water sciences.  Members of the CRI conduct research on regional, national and international issues related to rivers and their land-water linkages.

With researchers from both UNB campuses, the CRI develops the aquatic science needed to understand, protect and sustain water resources. Since 2013, the CRI and its partners have been working with NB Power to research the potential environmental impacts of the future options being considered for the Mactaquac Generating Station. The Mactaquac Dam on the Saint John River will reach the end of its lifespan by 2030, and CRI has been evaluating key environmental challenges such as river health, fish passage and flow management. In 2015, CRI was given an additional $2.8 million from the Natural Sciences and Engineering Research Council (NSERC) to conduct an aquatic ecosystem study on the Saint John River.

In 2021, Parks Canada announced their first research chair in aquatic restoration, carrying out Atlantic salmon recovery research with researchers from the Canadian Rivers Institute.

Mi'kmaq-Wolastoqey Centre (MWC)
UNB created its BEd program for First Nations students in 1977 in an effort to help First Nations communities take control of their own schools. In 1981, the Mi'kmaq-Maliseet Institute (MMI), the former name of the MWC, opened its doors with an expanded mandate to train professionals and improve First Nations access to First Nations education. The Institute provided a variety of services, including research, curriculum development, language education, policy development, children's literacy, and more. In addition, the Institute funded the Mi'kmaq-Maliseet Resource Collection, which contains materials that are immensely valuable to knowledge of First Nations culture, history, and perspective in the region.

Canadian Research Institute for Social Policy
The Canadian Research Institute for Social Policy was founded in 1996 as the Atlantic Centre for Policy Research, supported by the Canadian Institute For Advanced Research. The name change took effect in January 2000. The institute was designated as a Statistics Canada Research Data Centre in 2002. The institute brings interdisciplinary researchers together to focus on issues pertaining to social policy on a national and international level, specifically issues relevant to children and youth development. Projects included the New Brunswick Schools Early Literacy Initiative; Mapping Literacy as a Determinant of Health; Raising and Leveling the Bar: A Collaborative Research Initiative on Children's Learning, Behavioural, and Health Outcomes; and the Confident Learners Initiative.

Medical Training Centre
The University of New Brunswick's Medical Training Centre is the first anglophone school of medicine in New Brunswick. It is a joint medical programme, offered with Dalhousie University Faculty of Medicine.

Polytechnic controversy
In the fall of 2007, a report commissioned by the provincial government recommended that UNBSJ and the New Brunswick Community College be reformed and consolidated into a new polytechnic post-secondary institute. The proposal immediately came under heavy criticism and led to the several organized protests. Under heavy fire from the public, the Graham government eventually announced that it would set aside the possibility of UNB Saint John losing its status as a university and would refer the report to a working group for further study. The government would go on to announce in January that UNBSJ would retain its liberal arts program and its association with UNB and the working group reported back to government in May, with its findings and government's response being made public in June.

The Strax affair 

In March 1969 UNB was censured by the Canadian Association of University Teachers (CAUT) because of its suspension of Norman Strax, a physics professor who had led protests in September 1968 against the introduction of photo id cards. The censure was lifted after the university agreed to engage in arbitration with Strax. Among the "tumultuous events" of the 1968–69 academic year were the occupation by Strax's supporters of his office in Loring Bailey Hall and the prosecution and jailing of a student journalist over an article in the Brunswickan.

Scholarships

UNB awards over five million dollars in scholarships each year. These include the Blake-Kirkpatrick, Beaverbrook, and President's scholarships. With $7.2 million available in undergraduate scholarships, one in two students entering UNB from high school received a scholarship as of 2015. UNB has a scholarship guarantee in which any admitted student with an average of 80% or higher will receive a guaranteed amount of five hundred dollars.

As a member of the Loran Scholars university consortium, UNB offers a matching tuition waiver as part of a $100,000 undergraduate scholarship to recognize incoming students who demonstrate "exemplary character, service and leadership". Five Loran Scholars have studied at UNB over the years. Additionally, it is part of the Schulich Leader Scholarships program, awarding an $100,000 STEM scholarship to an incoming engineering student and an $80,000 scholarship to a science, technology, or mathematics student each year.

Student life
UNB has approximately 10,000 students from over 100 countries. Students have over 125 clubs and societies to choose from between the Fredericton and Saint John campuses and there are 13 residences available to students in Fredericton and two in Saint John. Students on both campuses have access to UNB's facilities, fitness classes and outdoor activities such as snowshoeing and kayaking.  There are exchanges available in more than 35 countries around the world with over 89 university partners.

Athletics

UNB Fredericton is represented in U Sports by the UNB Reds while UNBSJ is represented in CCAA by the UNB Saint John Seawolves. The Reds compete in the following sports: men's and women's basketball, men's and women's hockey, men's and women's soccer, men's and women's volleyball, and swimming. Men's and women's track & field and cross country were added as a varsity sport for 2010–2011; this is a joint Fredericton/Saint John Campus program.

In the past, UNBF used different names for each individual sport's team; for instance, the men's swim team was the Beavers, and the hockey team was the Red Devils. The university club teams, which are supported financially by the Student Union as well as by individual members of the teams, do not use the Reds name and thus continue the tradition of using different nicknames for each sport.

Songs

Traditional among a number of songs commonly played and sung at various times such as commencement, convocation, and athletic events are "Carmina Universitatis Novi Brunsvici", "Alma Mater" (1904), and "UNB Anthem", with words by A.G. Bailey and music by D.V. Start.
Colloquial songs included "Bombers Away" to celebrate the football team:
Bombers away, my boys
Bombers away,
'Cause when you fight red bombers.
Fight you Bombers, Fight you Bombers,
Fight, Fight, Fight.

Notable academic milestones
UNB Saint John was the first university in Canada to offer an e-business program with its bachelor of business administration in electronic commerce. The university has since been ranked by Canadian Business Magazine as first in e-business.

People

List of presidents

 Paul Mazerolle (2019–)
 Eddy Campbell (2009–2019)
 John McLaughlin (2002–2009)
 Elizabeth Parr-Johnston (1996–2002)
 Robin L. Armstrong (1990–1996)
 James Downey (1980–1990)
 John M. Anderson (1973–1980)
 Desmond Pacey (1972)
 James Owen Dineen (1969–1972)
 Colin Bridges Mackay (1953–1969)
 Albert William Trueman (1948–1953)
 Milton Fowler Gregg (1944–1947)
 Norman Archibald Macrae MacKenzie (1940–1944)
 Cecil Charles Jones (1906–1940)
 Thomas Harrison (1885–1906)
 William Brydone Jack (1861–1885)
 Joseph R. Hea (1860–1861)
 Edwin Jacob (1829–1860)
 James Somerville (1811–1828)

Notable current and former faculty

 Xiaoyi Bao – Physicist, recognized for her contributions to the field of fiber optics
 Bill Bauer – Poet and short-story writer, critically acclaimed for his "strikingly inventive imagination"
 Philip Bryden – Current deputy minister of justice and deputy solicitor general of Alberta
 E. Sandra Byers  – academic psychologist and sexologist
 Silver Donald Cameron – Journalist, author, and playwright whose writing focused on social justice, nature, and the environment
 Eddy Campbell – Mathematician and former University president (2009–2019)
 Jacqui Cole – Head of the Molecular Engineering group in the Cavendish Laboratory at the University of Cambridge
 Baron d'Avray – New Brunswick superintendent of education (1854–1858)
 George Eulas Foster – Seven-times minister in the Government of Canada, and longtime member and senator in the Parliament of Canada
 Karen Kidd – Aquatic ecotoxicologist and member of the International Joint Commission
 Gérard La Forest – Former puisne justice of the Supreme Court of Canada
 David Lametti – Current minister of justice and attorney general of Canada
 Nicole Letourneau – Child health scholar. Named to Canada's "Top 40 Under 40" people by the Globe and Mail (2008)
 Salem Masry – Founder of Universal Systems/CARIS
 Anne McLellan – Former deputy prime minister of Canada
 Brigadier Maurice Tugwell – Founder of the Mackenzie Institute think tank
 Petr Vaníček – Geophysicist and geodesist. Instigator and president of the Canadian Geophysical Union (1986–1988)

Notable alumni
As of 2020, the University of New Brunswick reports 90,000 living alumni, with over 39,000 in New Brunswick.

Media

The university presses, The Baron and The Brunswickan, are members of Canadian University Press. Publishing since 1867, The Brunswickan is the oldest official student publication in Canada.

UNB is also home to several notable magazines and journals, such as The Fiddlehead and Studies in Canadian Literature.

Radio
 107.3FM CFMH-FM (Saint John)
 97.9FM CHSR-FM (Fredericton)

Newspapers
 The Baron (Saint John campus)
 The Brunswickan (Fredericton campus)
 The Pillar (Engineering Newspaper) (Fredericton Campus)

Magazines and journals
 The Fiddlehead
 Studies in Canadian Literature
 Acadiensis

See also
 List of oldest universities in continuous operation
 Higher education in New Brunswick
 List of universities and colleges in New Brunswick
 List of historic places in New Brunswick
 Maritime College of Forest Technology
 Atlantic University Sport
 U Sports
 Canadian government scientific research organizations
 Canadian university scientific research organizations
 Canadian industrial research and development organizations

Further reading
 Bailey, Alfred G., ed. The University of New Brunswick: Memorial Volume. Fredericton: University of New Brunswick, 1950.
 McGahan, Peter. The Quiet Campus: A History of the University of New Brunswick in Saint John, 1959–1969. Fredericton: New Ireland Press, 1998.
 Montague, Susan. A Pictorial History of the University of New Brunswick. Fredericton: University of New Brunswick, 1992.

References

External links

Arts Building, UNB, National Historic Site of Canada
William Brydone Jack Observatory, UNB, National Historic Site of Canada

 
Educational institutions established in 1785
1785 establishments in New Brunswick
Forestry education
Buildings and structures in Fredericton
Buildings and structures in Saint John, New Brunswick
Education in Saint John, New Brunswick
Education in Fredericton
Universities in New Brunswick
Distance education institutions based in Canada